Emilios Solomou (born 1971) is a Cypriot writer. He was born in Nicosia but grew up in the village of Potami. He studied at the University of Athens. Having worked in newspaper journalism for a few years, he now teaches Greek and history in high school. He has also served on the boards of the literary magazine Anef and the Union of Cyprus Writers.

His novels include:
 An Axe in Your Hands (winner, Cyprus State Prize for Literature)
 The Diary of an Infidelity (winner, EU Prize for Literature)
 Like a Sparrow, Quickly You Passed

He has been translated into English and Bulgarian.

References

1971 births
Cypriot novelists
Living people